Samuel John Goldwyn Jr. (September 7, 1926 – January 9, 2015) was an American film producer.

Early life

Samuel Goldwyn Jr. was born on September 7, 1926, in Los Angeles, California, the son of actress Frances Howard (born Frances Howard McLaughlin; 1903–1976) and the pioneer motion picture mogul Samuel Goldwyn (1882–1974). He attended Fountain Valley School in Colorado Springs, Colorado and the University of Virginia.

Career
After serving in the United States Army during World War II, he worked as a theatrical producer in London and for Edward R. Murrow at CBS in New York. He then followed in his father's footsteps and founded the motion picture production companies Formosa Productions, The Samuel Goldwyn Company and Samuel Goldwyn Films.

In 1950 Goldwyn married actor Jennifer Howard (1925–1993), the daughter of prominent author and screenwriter Sidney Howard. The couple had four children including actor Tony Goldwyn and studio executive John Goldwyn. They divorced in 1968 and he married a second time to Peggy Elliot with whom he had two children, including Liz Goldwyn. His second marriage also ended in divorce. At the time of his death he was married to his third wife, Patricia Strawn.

Death
Goldwyn died of congestive heart failure on January 9, 2015, at Cedars-Sinai Medical Center in Los Angeles, California, at the age of 88.

Partial filmography 
He was a producer in all films unless otherwise noted.

Film

Miscellaneous crew

As director

Thanks

Television

References

External links

1926 births
2015 deaths
American film producers
American film studio executives
American people of Polish-Jewish descent
Businesspeople from Colorado Springs, Colorado
Businesspeople from Los Angeles
People from Beverly Hills, California
Film producers from California
Samuel
Military personnel from California
United States Army personnel of World War II
University of Virginia alumni
20th-century American businesspeople
21st-century American businesspeople
Deaths from organ failure